This is a list of astrologers with Wikipedia articles.

A

Pietro d'Abano
Haly Abenragel
Sumanadasa Abeygunawardena
Evangeline Adams
John Addey
Adelard of Bath
Heinrich Cornelius Agrippa
Pierre d'Ailly
Albertus Magnus
Albubather
Alchabitius
Alcuin
Paulus Alexandrinus
Thomas Allen
William Andrews
Mustapha Adamu Animashaun
Antiochus of Athens
Ibn Arabi
Arcandam
Stephen Arroyo
Elias Ashmole
Madalyn Aslan

B

Francis Bacon
Roger Bacon
Marina Bai
Alice Bailey
Tiberius Claudius Balbilus
Abu Ma'shar al-Balkhi
Olivia Barclay
Muhammad ibn Jābir al-Harrānī al-Battānī
Clifford Bax
Philip Berg
Walter Berg
Berossus
Bhrigus
Abū Rayhān al-Bīrūnī
Joseph Blagrave
Hannes Bok
Guido Bonatti
Tycho Brahe
Rob Brezsny
Giordano Bruno

C

Jonathan Cainer
Tommaso Campanella
Campanus of Novara
Nicholas Campion
Gerolamo Cardano
Giovanni Domenico Cassini
Christopher Cattan
Geoffrey Chaucer
Cheiro
Martin Chemnitz
Henry Coley
Hermannus Contractus
Nicolaus Copernicus
Abiathar Crescas
Critodemus
Robert Thomas Cross
Aleister Crowley
Nicholas Culpeper

D

Bejan Daruwalla
Louis de Wohl
John Dee
Shakuntala Devi
Jeane Dixon
Dorotheus of Sidon
William Drummond of Logiealmond
Gerina Dunwich

E

Reinhold Ebertin
Edward'O
Dennis Elwell
Epigenes
Michael Erlewine
Abraham ibn Ezra

F

Cyril Fagan
Rui Faleiro
Jing Fang
Barry Fantoni
Ibrahim al-Fazari
Muhammad al-Fazari
Serge Raynaud de la Ferrière
Jack Fertig
Marsilio Ficino
Nigidius Figulus
Roy C. Firebrace
Lucius Taruntius Firmanus
Robert Fludd
Simon Forman
Paolo Fox
Eric Francis
David Frawley

G

John Gadbury
Jacques Gaffarel
Galileo Galilei
W. D. Gann
Rockie Gardiner
Pierre Gassendi
Michel Gauquelin
Luca Gaurico
Gan De
David Gans
Gerard of Cremona
Gersonides
Yukteswar Giri
A. Frank Glahn
Linda Goodman
Russell Grant
Liz Greene

H

Z'ev ben Shimon Halevi
Manly Palmer Hall
Robert Hand
Erik Jan Hanussen
Françoise Hardy
Harkhebi
Thomas Harriot
Franz Hartmann
Jābir ibn Hayyān
Max Heindel
Hephaistio of Thebes
Herman of Carinthia
Hermann of Reichenau
Hermes Trismegistus
Christopher Heydon
Hipparchus
Hippocrates
Abraham bar Hiyya
Gustav Holst
Margaret Hone
Deborah Houlding
Bruno Huber
Hypatia of Alexandria

I
Isaac Israeli ben Joseph

J

Jaimini
Joyce Jillson
John of Eschenden
Marc Edmund Jones
Mangal Raj Joshi
Carl Jung

K

Johannes Kelpius
Warren Kenton
Johannes Kepler
Muhammad ibn Mūsā al-Khwārizmī
al-Kindi
Karl Ernst Krafft

L

John Lambe
Bonet de Lattes
Sybil Leek
Alan Leo
Jim Lewis
Johannes Lichtenberger
William Lilly
Guido von List
Ramon Llull

M

Magi
Giovanni Antonio Magini
Marcus Manilius
A. T. Mann
Mantreswara
Gregory Paul Martin
Mashallah ibn Athari
Julius Firmicus Maternus
Richard Mead
Philipp Melanchthon
Walter Mercado
Merlin
Franz Mesmer
Francis Moore
Marcia Moore
Pauline Moran
Jean-Baptiste Morin
Richard James Morrison
Mystic Meg

N

Valentine Naibod
John Napier
Richard Napier
Naubakht
R. H. Naylor
Don Neroman
Nostradamus
Domenico Maria Novara da Ferrara

O
Olympiodorus the Younger
Sydney Omarr
Haruka Orth

P

Paracelsus
Parameshvara
Parashara
Derek Parker
Julia Parker
William Parron
John Partridge
Pellitus
Nigel Pennick
Georg von Peuerbach
Porphyry
Tiphaine Raguenel
Pseudo-Geber
Ptolemy
Pythagoras
Pothuluru Veerabrahmendra

Q

Joan Quigley

R

Bangalore Venkata Raman
Heinrich Rantzau
Robert Thomas Cross
Regiomontanus
Carl Reichenbach
Georg Joachim Rheticus
Rhetorius of Egypt
Richard of Wallingford
Ali ibn Ridwan
Lois Rodden
Roger of Hereford
Dane Rudhyar
Cosimo Ruggeri

S

Gunter Sachs
JoJo Savard
Johannes Schöner
Michael Scot
Sepharial
Shi Shen
Ebenezer Sibly
Gautama Siddha
 Gironima Spana 
Karl Spiesberger
Count of St. Germain
Johannes Stadius
Johannes Stöffler
Jackie Stallone
Athena Starwoman
Ludwig Straniak
Shelley von Strunckel
Sudines
Pope Sylvester II

U
Chandramauli Upadhyay
Harilal Upadhyay
Mellie Uyldert

V

Daivajna Varāhamihira
John Varley
Arnaldus de Villa Nova
Johannes Virdung
Varāhamihira

W

Walcher of Malvern
David Wells
William of Marseille
Alfred Witte
Maurice Woodruff
Wilhelm Wulff

Y
Yavanesvara
William Butler Yeats
Ibn Yunus

Z
Abraham Zacuto
Zadkiel
C. C. Zain
Abū Ishāq Ibrāhīm al-Zarqālī

In literature 
Klingsor, four fictional German astrologers
Professor Trelawney

See also 
List of occultists
List of alchemists
List of astronomers (contains many astrologers as well, especially of antiquity)
List of Muslim astronomers
List of Hindu astrology

References

Astrologers

Astrologer
Astrologer
Astrology-related lists